Tropidophorus baviensis, also known commonly as the Bavi water skink or Bavay's keeled skink,  is a species of lizard in the subfamily Sphenomorphinae of the family Scincidae. The species is native to Southeast Asia.

Geographic range
T. baviensis is found in northern Vietnam and in adjacent northeastern Laos (Xiangkhouang Province). Records from Thailand are considered erroneous.

The type locality (to which the specific name baviensis refers) is Mt. Ba Vi, Ha Tay Province, northern Vietnam.

Habitat

Reproduction
T. baviensis is viviparous.

References

Further reading
Bourret RL (1939). "Notes herpétologiques sur l'Indochine française. XVII. Reptiles et Batraciens reçus au Laboratoire des Sciences Naturelles de l'Université au cours de l'année 1938. Descriptions de trois espèces nouvelles ". Annexe Bulletin Général Instruction Publique, Hanoi 6: 13–34. (Tropidophorus baviensis, new species). (in French).
Ngo A, Murphy RW, Orlov NL, Darevsky IL, Nguyen VS (2000). "A Redescription of the Ba Vi Water Skink Tropidophorus baviensis Bourret, 1939". Russian Journal of Herpetology 7 (2): 155–158.

baviensis
Reptiles of Laos
Reptiles of Vietnam
Reptiles described in 1939
Taxa named by René Léon Bourret